Nicholas George Denes (Romanian: Nicolae George Deneș (December 16, 1906 – November 28, 1975) was an American football, basketball, and baseball coach.  He served as the head football coach at Western Kentucky University from 1957 to 1967, compiling a record of 57–39–7.  His 1963 Western Kentucky Hilltoppers football team went undefeated, winning the Ohio Valley Conference conference title and the 1963 Tangerine Bowl. Denes was also the head baseball coach at Western Kentucky from 1958 to 1962, tallying a mark of 48–40–1. Nick Denes Field, the home venue for the Western Kentucky Hilltoppers baseball team, is named for him.  Denes was the head football coach at the University of Tennessee Junior College—now known as the University of Tennessee at Martin—from 1937 to 1938.  He coached athletics at Corbin High School in Corbin, Kentucky from 1929 to 1937 and at Louisville Male High School in Louisville, Kentucky from 1939 to 1957.

Early life and education
Denes was born in 1906 in Bucharest, Romania and raised in Garrett, Indiana. He graduated from the University of Illinois and received a master's degree from the University of Kentucky.

Coaching career
Denes began his coaching career in 1927, as a backfield coach for the football team at Champaign High School in Champaign, Illinois. In 1929 he was hired as head football and head basketball coach at Corbin High School in Corbin, Kentucky.  His football teams compiled a record of 63–11–5 in eight seasons. They were champions of the Cumberland Valley Conference four times (1931, 1933–1935) and runners-up twice (1930, 1932).  His basketball teams were 142–39 and won the Cumberland Valley Conference four times (1929, 1931, 1932, 1936).

Death
Denes died on November 28, 1975, at Greenview Hospital in Bowling Green, Kentucky.

Head coaching record

College football

References

External links
 

1906 births
1975 deaths
UT Martin Skyhawks football coaches
Western Kentucky Hilltoppers baseball coaches
Western Kentucky Hilltoppers football coaches
High school basketball coaches in Kentucky
High school football coaches in Kentucky
High school football coaches in Illinois
Junior college football coaches in the United States
University of Illinois Urbana-Champaign alumni
University of Kentucky alumni
People from DeKalb County, Indiana
Sportspeople from Bucharest
Sportspeople from Indiana
Romanian emigrants to the United States